Worldfall is an EP by the Illinois black metal band Nachtmystium. It was released April 5, 2008 via Century Media Records.

It contains the songs that would have made up the Nachtmystium side of the Nachtmystium/Leviathan split album, which has been delayed due to legal issues with Leviathan's record label.

Track listing
 Woldfall
 Depravity
 Solitary Voyage 
 Rose Clouds of Holocaust (Death in June cover)
 IV (Goatsnake cover)

Personnel

Additional personnel
 Christophe Szpajdel — logo

Nachtmystium albums
2008 EPs